Confusa e felice is the 2nd album by Italian singer-songwriter Carmen Consoli, issued in 1997. The album takes its name from the song "Confusa e felice" ("Confused and happy"), presented at Sanremo Music Festival 1997 and eliminated from the competition after the first night. The album was certificated platinum and sold over 120,000 copies.

Track listing
 Bonsai #1 - 1:02
 Uguale a ieri - 3:59
 Diversi - 3:53
 Confusa e felice - 3:38
 Fidarmi delle tue carezze - 3:33
 Un sorso in più - 3:54
 Venere - 3:51
 Per niente stanca - 4:25
 Fino all'ultimo - 5:03
 Blunotte - 4:03
 La bellezza delle cose - 4:03
 Bonsai #2 - 1:01

References

1997 albums